Frank Funk may refer to:
Francis Funk, Hawaiian military adjutant general
Frank H. Funk (1869–1940), U.S. Representative from Illinois
Frank Funk (baseball) (born 1935), American Major League Baseball pitcher
Frank Funk, member of the National Sprint Car Hall of Fame